Inferior cerebellar arteries may refer to: 
 Anterior inferior cerebellar artery
 Posterior inferior cerebellar artery